Milford Township is the name of some places in the U.S. state of Pennsylvania:

 Milford Township, Bucks County, Pennsylvania
 Milford Township, Juniata County, Pennsylvania
 Milford Township, Pike County, Pennsylvania
 Milford Township, Somerset County, Pennsylvania

See also 
 Milford, New Jersey
 Milford, Pennsylvania,  a borough in Pike County
 Lower Milford Township, Lehigh County, Pennsylvania
 New Milford Township, Susquehanna County, Pennsylvania
 Upper Milford Township, Lehigh County, Pennsylvania
 Milford (disambiguation)

Pennsylvania township disambiguation pages